The Westland CL.20 (aka Cierva-Lepère C.31) was a two-seat autogyro designed and built by Westland Aircraft between 1934 and 1938. One flying prototype and six airframes were built, which had control problems and insufficient lift. Before these problems could be solved the programme was abandoned and the prototype was scrapped in 1938.

Development
Before the Westland C.29 had proven to be a failure, "Teddy" Petter sought to design another cabin autogyro in collaboration with George Lepère, a French autogyro designer with the Lioré et Olivier aircraft company. The initial design was by Georges Lepère in association with the Cierva Autogiro Company and was based on the Cierva-Lepère C.L. 10B. Detailed design was by Westland's Arthur Davenport and Petter.

Construction was completed in December 1934 and in January 1935 taxi-ing trials were carried out at Yeovil by Harald Penrose, after which it was transported to the Cierva flight test centre at Hanworth Aerodrome, where Juan de la Cierva flew the prototype on its first flight on 5 February 1935. To improve lift, a more powerful Niagra engine was fitted but this made little difference.

Despite the poor performance of the prototype, Teddy Petter persuaded Westland to manufacture another six airframes, but further development was abandoned due to emerging work as a result of the threat of war. At the end of development flying the prototype had logged 8 hours 31 minutes flying time over 61 flights, before the flying prototype was scrapped in 1938.

Design
Based on the CL.10B, the load bearing structure of the CL.20s fuselage was based on three welded seamless steel tubes (forming a flat bottomed triangle in cross section) carrying light alloy formers. On this, light alloy stringers were fixed and covered in fabric, producing a multi-faceted surface. The cabin structure consisted of a light-alloy arched former at the back with a wooden floor. On each side a large door and additional windows reached down to the bottom longeron, giving both excellent access and downward vision.

The three-bladed rotor could be folded for storage and transport. Three fins were fitted, two as endplates to the tail-plane, one half of which was fitted with negative camber and incidence, in order to help offset the effects of the rotor.

The CL.20 was initially powered by a  Pobjoy radial engine, driving a two-bladed tractor propeller, modified to include a power take-off shaft to spin up the rotors for take off. During flight testing, in an attempt to improve performance, a more powerful Pobjoy Niagara III was fitted.

Specifications

References 

Single-engined tractor autogyros
CL.20
Aircraft first flown in 1935